Helen Burke, Countess Clanricarde (née MacCarty;  – 1722), also styled Helen FitzGerald, was brought to France by her mother fleeing the Cromwellian conquest of Ireland, against which her father, the 2nd Earl Muskerry, resisted to the bitter end. In France, she was educated at the abbey of Port-Royal-des-Champs together with her cousin Elizabeth Hamilton. She married three times. All her children were by her second husband, William Burke, 7th Earl of Clanricarde. She was the mother of Ulick Burke, 1st Viscount Galway, Margaret, Viscountess Iveagh, and Honora Sarsfield.

Birth and origins 
Helen was probably born in the early 1640s, probably at Macroom Castle, County Cork, Ireland, her parents' habitual residence. She was the eldest daughter of Donough MacCarty and his wife Eleanor Butler. At the time of Helen's birth, her father was the 2nd Viscount Muskerry, but he would be advanced to Earl of Clancarty in 1658. Her father's family were the MacCartys of Muskerry, a Gaelic Irish dynasty that branched from the MacCarthy-Mor line with Dermot MacCarthy, second son of Cormac MacCarthy-Mor, a medieval Prince of Desmond. This second son had been granted the Muskerry area as appanage.

Helen's mother was the eldest sister of James Butler, 1st Duke of Ormond. Her mother's family, the Butler dynasty, was Old English and descended from Theobald Walter, who had been appointed Chief Butler of Ireland by King Henry II in 1177. Helen's parents were both Catholic. They had married before 1641.

Helen had three brothers and one sister, which are listed in his father's article.

Irish wars 
She was a child while her father, Lord Muskerry, commanded the Confederates' Munster army and fought the Parliamentarians in the Cromwellian Conquest of Ireland. He fought to the bitter end, surrendering Ross Castle near Killarney to Edmund Ludlow on 27 June 1652 and disbanding his 5000-strong army. He was allowed to embark to Spain. He lost his estates in 1652 with the Cromwellian Act of Settlement. Arriving in Spain he found that he was not welcome and returned to Ireland in 1653, where he was put on trial for the murder of English settlers in 1642. He was, however, acquitted.

Exile 
Helen, aged about ten, her mother, her sister Margaret, and her brother Justin had fled to France already sometime before the fall of Ross Castle. Her mother lived with her sister Mary, Lady Hamilton, in the convent of the Feuillantines in Paris, and Helen was sent to boarding school at the abbey of Cistercian nuns of Port-Royal-des-Champs, near Versailles, together with her cousin Elizabeth Hamilton. This school had an excellent reputation and was ahead of its time by teaching in French rather than in Latin. She attended this school for seven or eight years. The abbey also was a stronghold of Jansenism, a Catholic religious movement that insisted on earnestness and asceticism. In 1658 her father was created Earl of Clancarty by Charles II in Brussels, where he was then in exile.

Restoration and first marriage 
At the Restoration her father returned to Ireland and recovered his estates in 1660 and was confirmed in their possession in the Act of Settlement 1662. 

Helen stayed behind in France at her convent. However, Jansenism was declared heretic for its stance on grace and original sin. Helen was forcibly removed from the abbey in 1661 and was accommodated by Louis Charles d'Albert de Luynes.

Her brother Charles, Viscount Muskerry, as he was now, attended the court in Whitehall together with his wife, who was ridiculed by Elizabeth Hamilton who had been together with her at school.

Helen MacCarty soon married Sir John FitzGerald, Lord of the Decies, seated at Dromana House near Villierstown, County Waterford, as his second wife. His first wife had been Katherine Power, second daughter of John Power, 5th Baron Power, of Curraghmore, whom he had married in 1658 and who had died on 22 August 1660. John and Katherine had had an only child, Katherine FitzGerald, Viscountess Grandison, who would marry Edward FitzGerald-Villiers and become the mother of John Villiers, 1st Earl Grandison. Helen's first marriage was childless and lasted only one or two years as Decies died in 1662.

In 1665 her brother Charles, Lord Muskerry, was killed during the Second Anglo-Dutch War (1665–1667) in the Battle of Lowestoft, a naval engagement with the Dutch.

Second marriage 
Her second marriage was to William Burke, 7th Earl of Clanricarde, which brought her the title of Countess of Clanricarde in the Peerage of Ireland. Clanricarde already had sons from a previous marriage, two of whom would succeed him as the 8th and the 9th earls.

William and Helen had four children:

Ulick (1670–1691), created Viscount of Galway and slain at the Battle of Aughrim fighting for the Jacobites
Margaret (1673–1744), married first Bryan Magennis, 5th Viscount Iveagh and then Thomas Butler of Garryricken
William, died childless
Honora (1674–1698), married first Patrick Sarsfield and then the Duke of Berwick

She seems to have lived at Portumna Castle. At least it is known that her daughter Honora was born there.

Her father, Lord Clancarty, died in London on 4 August 1665. Her husband Clanricarde died in 1687 and was succeeded by his son Richard from his first marriage as the 8th Earl of Clanricarde. She was now about 46 years old. In 1689 her brother Justin lost the Battle of Newtownbutler against the Inniskilleners and was taken prisoner. Her son Ulick was killed along with many senior Jacobite officers at the Battle of Aughrim in 1691.

Third marriage, death, and timeline 
Helen married again, sometime between 1687 and 1700, to Colonel Thomas Burke. The marriage was childless. Her husband died in about 1719 and she died on 15 February 1721 at Kilcash Castle, the house of her daughter, Margaret. Her substantial fortune was the subject of much legal dispute in succeeding generations.

Notes and references

Notes

Citations

Sources 

 
  – Jim Burke!
  – Abdy to Hutchinson (for Clanricarde)
  (for MacCarty)
 
 
 
  – Canonteign to Cutts (for Clancarty and Clanricarde)
  – 1649 to 1782
  – Scotland and Ireland
  – 1625 to 1655
  – Google Books no preview
  – (for timeline)
 
 
  – Blood royal, dukes, earls (for Clanricarde)
  – Viscounts (for Thurles)
  – Irish stem
 
 
 
 
 

17th-century Irish people
18th-century Irish people
Daughters of Irish earls
Clanricarde
MacCarthy dynasty
People from County Cork
People from County Galway